Via et veritas et vita is a Latin phrase meaning "the way and the truth and the life".

These words, and sometimes the asyndetic variant via veritas vita, have been used as the motto of various educational institutions and governments.

New Testament

The phrase is found in verse 6 of chapter 14 of the Gospel of John, as part of Jesus' Farewell Discourse during the Last Supper:

"5 Thomas said to him, 'Lord, we do not know where you are going. How can we know the way?' 6 Jesus said to him, I am the way, and the truth, and the life. No one comes to the Father except through me. 7 If you know me, you will know my Father also. From now on you do know him and have seen him.'"(New Revised Standard Version)

In the original Koine Greek, the phrase is ἡ ὁδὸς καὶ ἡ ἀλήθεια καὶ ἡ ζωή; hē hodos kai hē alētheia kai hē zōē.

In the Latin Vulgate, verse 6 states: "dicit ei Iesus ego sum via et veritas et vita nemo venit ad Patrem nisi per me".

Christian theology 

This concept is foundational to Christian theology and the primary mechanism by which the metaphysics of Christianity establish a separation between theological principles of the earlier Judaism and other Abrahamic religions, in addition to Pauline directives not to practice the mitzvot and an establishment of Jesus Christ as divine.

It only appears in John 14:6, likely the latest of the gospels, and consistent with the debates about the divinity of the Christian messiah and the split that was occurring in the earliest churches between orthodoxy and Arianism.

It asserts that the Christian religion is the only path or method by which one receives forgiveness of sins, consistent with the Christian belief in original sin, and therefore eternal life of the soul following the death of the corporal body. The more liberal interpretations see this verse as an exultation and not a mandatory commandment, believing that any human being will receive eternal reward provided they live an ethical life and treat others according to the principles of the golden rule. Some interpretations call for a personal development and growth toward Christ, meaning, toward greater unity and communion with other human beings, while the more orthodox denominations interpret the verse more faithfully to the text as a direct commandment wherein Christ himself is the only true path to salvation.

Usage as a motto

Government
 Arad, the capital of Arad County, Romania.
 The variation Veritas, Via, Vitae, appears on the seal of the Province of Negros Oriental, the Philippines.

Educational institutions

Higher education
University of Glasgow in Glasgow, Scotland founded 1451
Saint Xavier University in Chicago, Illinois, United States, founded 1846
St. Benedict's College in Atchsion Kansas, United States, founded 1858
Wycliffe Hall, Oxford, Anglican theological college, permanent private hall of University of Oxford, founded 1877
Kings University College at The University of Western Ontario in London, Ontario, Canada, founded 1878
Eastern Nazarene College in Quincy, Massachusetts, founded 1900
Japan Women's University in Tokyo, Japan, founded 1901
Silliman University in Dumaguete, Philippines, founded 1901
Providence University College and Theological Seminary in Otterburne, Manitoba, Canada founded 1925
Tamil Nadu Theological Seminary in Madurai, India, founded 1969
Regis College in Weston, Massachusetts, founded 1927

Secondary education
Our Lady of Mercy School for Young Women in Brighton, Monroe County, New York, founded 1928
Bishop Garcia Diego High School in Santa Barbara, California, founded 1959
St. Thomas High School in Pointe-Claire, Quebec, Canada, founded 1960
St. Francis Xavier College in Beaconsfield, Berwick, Officer, Victoria, Australia, founded 1978
St. Philip's Christian College in Waratah, New South Wales, Australia, founded 1982
John Paul College in Coffs Harbour, New South Wales, Australia, founded 1983
Boston Trinity Academy in Hyde Park, Massachusetts, founded 2002
Christ the King College in Newport, Isle of Wight, England, founded 2008
St John Fisher Catholic College in Newcastle-under-Lyme, Staffordshire

It is also the motto of some Canossian schools:
Sacred Heart Canossian College in Hong Kong
Sacred Heart Canossian College of Commerce in Hong Kong
Sacred Heart Canossian Kindergarten in Hong Kong
Sacred Heart Canossian School in Hong Kong
Sacred Heart Canossian School Private Section in Hong Kong
Saint Anthony's Canossian Secondary School in Bedok, Singapore

Primary education
Saint Anthony's Canossian Primary School in Bedok, Singapore
Canossa Convent Primary School in Singapore, Singapore
Sacred Heart Canossian Convent in Malacca, Malaysia

See also
This is also inscribed above the entrance to the Saint Stephen Basilica in Budapest, Hungary. 
List of mottos
List of university mottos
Related Bible parts: John 14
Jesus maze, in Sussex, England planted in the form of this quotation

References

Latin mottos
Eastern Nazarene College
Arad, Romania
Gospel of John
Truth